Dennis Gyamfi (born 30 December 2001) is a Dutch professional footballer who plays as a right back for Den Bosch.

Gyamfi grew up in England and is a product of the Leicester City and Brentford academies. He began his senior career with Dinamo Zagreb II in 2020 and transferred to Den Bosch in 2023.

Club career

Youth career and Dinamo Zagreb II 
A right back, Gyamfi began his career with spells in the youth systems at English clubs Hanworth Sports, Brentford and Leicester City. At the end of the 2019–20 season, he turned down the offer of a three-year professional contract with Leicester City and became a free agent. Gyamfi signed a -year contract with Croatian First League club Dinamo Zagreb on a free transfer in December 2020. He made 26 Croatian Second League appearances and scored one goal for the reserve team prior to its disbandment at the end of the 2021–22 season.

In July 2022, Gyamfi joined League One club Cheltenham Town on trial and made four pre-season friendly appearances, but was not offered a contract. He failed to win a call into a Dinamo Zagreb matchday squad during the first half of the 2022–23 season and departed the Stadion Maksimir in January 2023.

FC Den Bosch 
Following a successful trial spell, Gyamfi signed a -year contract with Eerste Divisie club FC Den Bosch on 31 January 2023.

International career 
Gyamfi is eligible to play for Netherlands, Ghana and England at international level. In November 2019, Gyamfi was named in the Netherlands U19 squad as a standby for two friendly matches. He did not win a call into either matchday squad.

Personal life 
Born in the Netherlands of Ghanaian descent, Gyamfi moved to England with his parents at age seven. He is fluent in the Dutch language. His brothers Gideon, Johnson and Pierluigi also became footballers. Gyamfi attended Loughborough College.

Career statistics

References

External links

Dennis Gyamfi at onsoranje.nl
Dennis Gyamfi at hns-cff.hr

Living people
Dutch footballers
GNK Dinamo Zagreb players
Association football fullbacks
People from Leiderdorp
Dutch people of Ghanaian descent
Dutch emigrants to England
English expatriate sportspeople in Croatia
Dutch expatriate sportspeople in Croatia
Eerste Divisie players
FC Den Bosch players
2001 births
Dutch expatriate footballers
English expatriate footballers
Expatriate footballers in Croatia